The 2021 Tohoku Rakuten Golden Eagles season was the 17th season of the Tohoku Rakuten Golden Eagles franchise. The Eagles played their home games at Rakuten Seimei Park Miyagi in the city of Sendai as members of Nippon Professional Baseball's Pacific League. The team was led by Kazuhisa Ishii in his first season as team manager.

They were eliminated by the Chiba Lotte Marines in the First Stage in two games.

Regular season

Standings

Record vs. opponents

Interleague

Opening Day roster 
Friday, March 26, 2021, vs. Hokkaido Nippon-Ham Fighters

Game log

|-align="center" bgcolor="bbffbb"
| 1 || March 26 || Fighters || 8–2 || Wakui (1–0) || Uwasawa (0–1) || — || Rakuten Seimei Park || 14,559 || 1–0–0 || W1
|-align="center" bgcolor="ffbbbb"
| 2 || March 27 || Fighters || 4–9 || Kato (1–0) || Takata (0–1) || — || Rakuten Seimei Park || 14,681 || 1–1–0 || L1
|-align="center" bgcolor="bbffbb"
| 3 || March 28 || Fighters  || 5–0 || Hayakawa (1–0) || Ikeda (0–1) || — || Rakuten Seimei Park || 14,425 || 2–1–0 || W1
|-align="center" bgcolor="bbffbb"
| 4 || March 30 || @ Marines || 5–0 || Kishi (1–0) || Ojima (0–1) || — || Zozo Marine Stadium || 9,931 || 3–1–0 || W2
|-align="center" bgcolor="bbffbb"
| 5 || March 31 || @ Marines || 2–1 || Norimoto (1–0) || Iwashita (0–1) || Matsui (1) || Zozo Marine Stadium || 9,594 || 4–1–0 || W3
|-

|-align="center" bgcolor="ffbbbb"
| 6 || April 1 || @ Marines || 5–16 || Motomae (1–0) || Takinaka (0–1) || — || Zozo Marine Stadium || 7,447 || 4–2–0 || L1
|-align="center" bgcolor="bbffbb"
| 7 || April 2 || Buffaloes || 4–2 || Wakui (2–0) || Yamasaki (0–1) || Matsui (2) || Rakuten Seimei Park || 7,247 || 5–2–0 || W1
|-align="center" bgcolor="bbffbb"
| 8 || April 3 || Buffaloes || 3–2 || Anraku (1–0) || Yamaoka (0–2) || Matsui (3) || Rakuten Seimei Park || 9,856 || 6–2–0 || W2
|-align="center" bgcolor="ffbbbb"
| 9 || April 4 || Buffaloes || 0–4 || Miyagi (2–0) || Hayakawa (1–1) || — || Rakuten Seimei Park || 7,376 || 6–3–0 || L1
|-align="center" bgcolor="bbffbb"
| 10 || April 6 || @ Lions || 13–2 || Kishi (2–0) || Matsumoto (1–1) || — || MetLife Dome || 8,608 || 7–3–0 || W1
|-align="center" bgcolor="bbffbb"
| 11 || April 7 || @ Lions || 6–3 || Norimoto (2–0) || Imai (0–1) || — || MetLife Dome || 7,390 || 8–3–0 || W2
|-align="center" bgcolor="bbffbb"
| 12 || April 8 || @ Lions || 4–0 || Takinaka (1–1) || Uema (0–1) || — || MetLife Dome || 6,653 || 9–3–0 || W3
|-align="center" bgcolor="ffeeaa"
| 13 || April 9 || Hawks || 1–1 || colspan=3|Game tied after 9 innings || Rakuten Seimei Park || 5,049 || 9–3–1 || T1
|-align="center" bgcolor="ffeeaa"
| 14 || April 10 || Hawks || 8–8 || colspan=3|Game tied after 9 innings || Rakuten Seimei Park || 8,122 || 9–3–2 || T2
|-align="center" bgcolor="ffbbbb"
| 15 || April 11 || Hawks || 0–2 || Taura (1–0) || Hayakawa (1–2) || Mori (3) || Rakuten Seimei Park || 8,515 || 9–4–2 || L1
|-align="center" bgcolor="ffbbbb"
| 16 || April 13 || Marines|| 2–6 || Ishikawa (1–0) || Kishi (2–1) || Masuda (2) || Rakuten Seimei Park || 6,188 || 9–5–2 || L2
|-align="center" bgcolor="ffeeaa"
| 17 || April 14 || Marines || 2–2 || colspan=3|Game tied after 9 innings || Rakuten Seimei Park || 6,303 || 9–5–3 || T1
|-align="center" bgcolor="ffbbbb"
| 18 || April 15 || Marines || 3–7 || Iwashita (2–1) || Takinaka (1–2) || — || Rakuten Seimei Park || 5,874 || 9–6–3 || L1
|-align="center" bgcolor="bbffbb"
| 19 || April 16 || @ Fighters || 4–1 || Wakui (3–0) || Hori (1–1) || Matsui (4) || Tokyo Dome || 9,559 || 10–6–3 || W1
|-align="center" bgcolor="ffbbbb"
| 20 || April 17 || @ Fighters || 1–4 || Uwasawa (1–2) || Tanaka (0–1) || Sugiura (4) || Tokyo Dome || 9,985 || 10–7–3 || L1
|-align="center" bgcolor="bbffbb"
| 21 || April 18 || @ Fighters || 4–1 || Hayakawa (2–2) || Kaneko (0–1) || Matsui (5) || Tokyo Dome || 9,981 || 11–7–3 || W1
|-align="center" bgcolor="ffbbbb"
| 22 || April 20 || @ Hawks || 4–6 || Kayama (1–0) || Kishi (2–2) || Mori (5) || Kitakyushu Stadium || 9,801 || 11–8–3 || L1
|-align="center" bgcolor="ffbbbb"
| 23 || April 21 || @ Hawks || 1–4 || Wada (2–1) || Norimoto (2–1) || Mori (6) || PayPay Dome || 12,049 || 11–9–3 || L2
|-align="center" bgcolor="ffeeaa"
| 24 || April 23 || Lions || 2–2 || colspan=3|Game tied after 9 innings || Rakuten Seimei Park || 6,205 || 11–9–4 || T1
|-align="center" bgcolor="bbffbb"
| 25 || April 24 || Lions || 2–1 || Tanaka (1–1) || Honda (0–1) || Matsui (6) || Rakuten Seimei Park || 6,619 || 12–9–4 || W1
|-align="center" bgcolor="bbffbb"
| 26 || April 25 || Lions || 8–4 || Hayakawa (3–2) || Hirai (3–1) || — || Rakuten Seimei Park || 7,037 || 13–9–4 || W2
|-align="center" bgcolor="ffeeaa"
| 27 || April 27 || @ Buffaloes || 5–5 || colspan=3|Game tied after 9 innings || Kyocera Dome || — || 13–9–5 || T1
|-align="center" bgcolor="ffeeaa"
| 28 || April 28 || @ Buffaloes || 0–0 || colspan=3|Game tied after 9 innings || Kyocera Dome || — || 13–9–6 || T2
|-align="center" bgcolor="#bbbbbb"
| — || April 29 || @ Buffaloes || colspan=4|Postponed (COVID-19) – Makeup date: October 20 || Kyocera Dome || — || — || —
|-align="center" bgcolor="bbffbb"
| 29 || April 30 || Marines || 8–1 || Wakui (4–0) || Nakamura (0–1) || — || Rakuten Seimei Park || 4,734 || 14–9–6 || W1
|-

|-align="center" bgcolor="bbffbb"
| 30 || May 1 || Marines || 3–0 || Tanaka (2–1) || Futaki (1–2) || Matsui (7) || Rakuten Seimei Park || 7,914 || 15–9–6 || W2
|-align="center" bgcolor="ffbbbb"
| 31 || May 2 || Marines || 5–6 || Karakawa (2–1) || Matsui (0–1) || Masuda (6) || Rakuten Seimei Park || 7,622 || 15–10–6 || L1
|-align="center" bgcolor="bbffbb"
| 32 || May 3 || @ Hawks || 7–4 || Takinaka (2–2) || Niho (0–1) || Matsui (8) || PayPay Dome || 18,382 || 16–10–6 || W1
|-align="center" bgcolor="ffbbbb"
| 33 || May 4 || @ Hawks || 4–6 || Tsumori (1–0) || Kishi (2–3) || Moinelo (2) || PayPay Dome || 18,584 || 16–11–6 || L1
|-align="center" bgcolor="ffeeaa"
| 34 || May 5 || @ Hawks || 5–5 || colspan=3|Game tied after 9 innings || PayPay Dome || 17,902 || 16–11–7 || T1
|-align="center" bgcolor="ffbbbb"
| 35 || May 7 || @ Fighters || 1–6 || VerHagen (1–2) || Wakui (4–1) || — || Sapporo Dome || 5,674 || 16–12–7 || L1
|-align="center" bgcolor="ffbbbb"
| 36 || May 8 || @ Fighters || 1–4 || Uwasawa (3–2) || Tanaka (2–2) || Rodriguez (1) || Sapporo Dome || 13,022 || 16–13–7 || L2
|-align="center" bgcolor="bbffbb"
| 37 || May 9 || @ Fighters || 6–3 || Hayakawa (4–2) || Ikeda (2–4) || Matsui (9) || Sapporo Dome || 9,698 || 17–13–7 || W1
|-align="center" bgcolor="ffeeaa"
| 38 || May 11 || Lions || 3–3 || colspan=3|Game tied after 9 innings || Rakuten Seimei Park || 5,128 || 17–13–8 || T1
|-align="center" bgcolor="bbffbb"
| 39 || May 12 || Lions || 4–3 || Norimoto (3–1) || Neal (0–1) || Matsui (10) || Rakuten Seimei Park || 5,128 || 18–13–8 || W1
|-align="center" bgcolor="ffbbbb"
| 40 || May 14 || @ Buffaloes || 4–9 || Yamaoka (2–3) || Wakui (4–2) || — || Hotto Motto Field || 4,888 || 18–14–8 || L1
|-align="center" bgcolor="ffbbbb"
| 41 || May 15 || @ Buffaloes || 3–4 || Takeyasu (2–0) || Tanaka (2–3) || Suzuki (1) || Hotto Motto Field || 7,795 || 18–15–8 || L2
|-align="center" bgcolor="bbffbb"
| 42 || May 16 || @ Buffaloes || 1–0 || Hayakawa (5–2) || Yamasaki (1–4) || — || Kyocera Dome || — || 19–15–8 || W1
|-align="center" bgcolor="bbffbb"
| 43 || May 18 || Fighters || 3–2 || Sung (1–0) || Rodriguez (0–1) || Matsui (11) || Rakuten Seimei Park || 6,016 || 20–15–8 || W2
|-align="center" bgcolor="bbffbb"
| 44 || May 19 || Fighters || 3–2 || Norimoto (4–1) || Kato (3–1) || Matsui (12) || Rakuten Seimei Park || 7,035 || 21–15–8 || W3
|-align="center" bgcolor="ffbbbb"
| 45 || May 20 || Fighters || 1–4 || Hori (2–1) || Fukuyama (0–1) || Sugiura (9) || Rakuten Seimei Park || 8,448 || 21–16–8 || L1
|-align="center" bgcolor="bbffbb"
| 46 || May 21 || @ Marines || 13–6 || Wakui (5–2) || Ishikawa (2–2) || — || Zozo Marine Stadium || 7,742 || 22–16–8 || W1
|-align="center" bgcolor="ffbbbb"
| 47 || May 22 || @ Marines || 1–3 || Karakawa (3–1) || Fukuyama (0–2) || Masuda (11) || Zozo Marine Stadium || 11,788 || 22–17–8 || L1
|-align="center" bgcolor="bbffbb"
| 48 || May 23 || @ Marines || 6–5 || Hayakawa (6–2) || Ojima (1–2) || Matsui (13) || Zozo Marine Stadium || 10,605 || 23–17–8 || W1
|-align="center" bgcolor="ffbbbb"
| 49 || May 25 || @ Giants || 4–9 || Togo (4–2) || Kishi (2–4) || — || Tokyo Dome || 10,329 || 23–18–8 || L1
|-align="center" bgcolor="ffbbbb"
| 50 || May 26 || @ Giants || 2–5 || Takahashi (6–1) || Norimoto (4–2) || De La Rosa (6) || Tokyo Dome || 9,778 || 23–19–8 || L2
|-align="center" bgcolor="bbffbb"
| 51 || May 27 || @ Giants || 2–0 || Takinaka (3–2) || Yokogawa (0–1) || Matsui (14) || Tokyo Dome || 8,953 || 24–19–8 || W1
|-align="center" bgcolor="ffbbbb"
| 52 || May 28 || BayStars || 6–7 || Kuniyoshi (1–0) || Wakui (5–3) || Mishima (7) || Rakuten Seimei Park || 10,822 || 24–20–8 || L1
|-align="center" bgcolor="ffeeaa"
| 53 || May 29 || BayStars || 1–1 || colspan=3|Game tied after 9 innings || Rakuten Seimei Park || 13,057 || 24–20–9 || T1
|-align="center" bgcolor="bbffbb"
| 54 || May 30 || BayStars  || 5–1 || Sakai (1–0) || Ishida (1–1) || — || Rakuten Seimei Park || 12,426 || 25–20–9 || W1
|-

|-align="center" bgcolor="ffbbbb"
| 55 || June 1 || @ Swallows || 4–7 || Onishi (1–0) || Sakai (1–1) || McGough (6) || Meiji Jingu Stadium || 7,809 || 25–21–9 || L1
|-align="center" bgcolor="bbffbb"
| 56 || June 2 || @ Swallows || 3–1 || Norimoto (5–2) || Taguchi (2–4) || Matsui (15) || Meiji Jingu Stadium || 7,543 || 26–21–9 || W1
|-align="center" bgcolor="bbffbb"
| 57 || June 3 || @ Swallows || 4–2 || Takinaka (4–2) || Sneed (1–1) || Matsui (16) || Meiji Jingu Stadium || 7,105 || 27–21–9 || W2
|-align="center" bgcolor="bbffbb"
| 58 || June 4 || @ Carp || 12–5 || Wakui (6–3) || Nakamura (0–3) || — || Mazda Stadium || 14,274 || 28–21–9 || W3
|-align="center" bgcolor="bbffbb"
| 59 || June 5 || @ Carp || 7–3 || Anraku (2–0)  || Horie (1–2) || — || Mazda Stadium || 16,231 || 29–21–9 || W4
|-align="center" bgcolor="bbffbb"
| 60 || June 6 || @ Carp || 6–4 || Hayakawa (7–2)  || Takahashi (2–2) || Matsui (17) || Mazda Stadium || 16,246 || 30–21–9 || W5
|-align="center" bgcolor="bbffbb"
| 61 || June 8 || Dragons || 5–2 || Kishi (3–4)  || Yanagi (5–2) || Matsui (18) || Rakuten Seimei Park || 10,850 || 31–21–9 || W6
|-align="center" bgcolor="ffbbbb"
| 62 || June 9 || Dragons || 3–7 || Ogasawara (4–2)  || Norimoto (5–3) || — || Rakuten Seimei Park || 8,854 || 31–22–9 || L1
|-align="center" bgcolor="bbffbb"
| 63 || June 10 || Dragons || 6–2 || Takinaka (5–2)  || Katsuno (3–4) || — || Rakuten Seimei Park || 8,782 || 32–22–9 || W1
|-align="center" bgcolor="ffbbbb"
| 64 || June 11 || Tigers || 2–3 || Aoyagi (5–2)  || Wakui (6–4) || Robert Suárez (20) || Rakuten Seimei Park || 12,525 || 32–23–9 || L1
|-align="center" bgcolor="ffbbbb"
| 65 || June 12 || Tigers || 1–9 || Ito (4–3)  || Tanaka (2–4) || — || Rakuten Seimei Park || 13,257 || 32–24–9 || L2
|-align="center" bgcolor="ffbbbb"
| 66 || June 13 || Tigers || 5–6 || Fujinami (4–3)  || Matsui (0–2) || Robert Suárez (21) || Rakuten Seimei Park || 13,155 || 32–25–9 || L3
|-align="center" bgcolor="ffbbbb"
| 67 || June 18 || Buffaloes || 2–5 || Yamamoto (7–5)  || Wakui (6–5) || Hirano (6) || Rakuten Seimei Park || 10,976 || 32–26–9 || L4
|-align="center" bgcolor="#bbbbbb"
| — || June 19 || Buffaloes || colspan=4|Postponed (rain) – Makeup date: June 21 || Rakuten Seimei Park || — || — || —
|-align="center" bgcolor="ffbbbb"
| 68 || June 20 || Buffaloes || 0–3 || Miyagi (7–1)  || Hayakawa (7–3) || Hirano (7) || Rakuten Seimei Park || 13,091 || 32–27–9 || L5
|-align="center" bgcolor="ffbbbb"
| 69 || June 21 || Buffaloes || 3–4 || Yamasaki (3–5)  || Takinaka (5–3) || Hirano (8) || Rakuten Seimei Park || 5,396 || 32–28–9 || L6
|-align="center" bgcolor="ffbbbb"
| 70 || June 22 || @ Lions|| 0–2 || Matsumoto (6–3)  || Kishi (3–5) || Taira (8) || MetLife Dome || 8,420 || 32–29–9 || L7
|-align="center" bgcolor="bbffbb"
| 71 || June 23 || @ Lions|| 6–4 || Tanaka (3–4)  || Watanabe (0–1) || Matsui (19) || MetLife Dome || 10,292 || 33–29–9 || W1
|-align="center" bgcolor="bbffbb"
| 72 || June 25 || Hawks || 5–1 || Norimoto (6–3)  || Ishikawa (3–7) || — || Rakuten Seimei Park || 7,917 || 34–29–9 || W2
|-align="center" bgcolor="bbffbb"
| 73 || June 26 || Hawks || 3–2 || Nishiguchi (1–0)  || Martinez (5–2) || Matsui (20) || Rakuten Seimei Park || 12,428 || 35–29–9 || W3
|-align="center" bgcolor="bbffbb"
| 74 || June 27 || Hawks || 3–2 || Anraku (3–0)  || Wada (4–5) || Matsui (21) || Rakuten Seimei Park || 9,680 || 36–29–9 || W4
|-align="center" bgcolor="ffeeaa"
| 75 || June 29 || Fighters || 5–5 || colspan=3|Game tied after 9 innings || Rakuten Seimei Park || 6,214 || 36–29–10 || T1
|-align="center" bgcolor="ffbbbb"
| 76 || June 30 || Fighters || 0–3 || Tateno (1–0)  || Wakui (6–6) || Sugiura (14) || Rakuten Seimei Park || 8,358 || 36–30–10 || L1
|-

|-align="center" bgcolor="ffbbbb"
| 77 || July 1 || Fighters || 1–2 || Ito (6–4)  || Kishi (3–6) || Sugiura (15) || Rakuten Seimei Park || 5,843 || 36–31–10 || L2
|-align="center" bgcolor="#bbbbbb"
| — || July 2 || @ Marines || colspan=4|Postponed (rain) – Makeup date: July 5 || Zozo Marine Stadium || — || — || —
|-align="center" bgcolor="ffbbbb"
| 78 || July 3 || @ Marines || 3–5 || Flores (1–0)  || Sung (1–1) || Masuda (19) || Zozo Marine Stadium || 12,409 || 36–32–10 || L3
|-align="center" bgcolor="ffbbbb"
| 79 || July 4 || @ Marines || 6–8 || Ojima (5–2)  || Takinaka (5–4) || Masuda (20) || Zozo Marine Stadium || 9,132 || 36–33–10 || L4
|-align="center" bgcolor="ffbbbb"
| 80 || July 5 || @ Marines || 1–8 || Iwashita (7–4)  || Nishiguchi (1–1) || — || Zozo Marine Stadium || 3,802 || 36–34–10 || L5
|-align="center" bgcolor="bbffbb"
| 81 || July 6 || @ Buffaloes || 7–2 || Norimoto (7–3)  || Hirano (0–3) || — || Kyocera Dome || 4,942 || 37–34–10 || W1
|-align="center" bgcolor="bbffbb"
| 82 || July 7 || @ Buffaloes || 6–5 || Busenitz (1–0)  || Urushihara (2–2) || Matsui (22) || Kyocera Dome || 4,989 || 38–34–10 || W2
|-align="center" bgcolor="ffeeaa"
| 83 || July 8 || @ Buffaloes || 1–1 || colspan=3|Game tied after 9 innings || Kyocera Dome || 4,997 || 38–34–11 || T1
|-align="center" bgcolor="ffbbbb"
| 84 || July 10 || Lions || 2–6 || Imai (6–3)  || Nishiguchi (1–1) || — || Rakuten Seimei Park || 13,049 || 38–35–11 || L1
|-align="center" bgcolor="bbffbb"
| 85 || July 11 || Lions || 9–3 || Sakai (2–1)  || Togame (1–1) || — || Rakuten Seimei Park || 11,832 || 39–35–11 || W1
|-align="center" bgcolor="ffbbbb"
| 86 || July 12 || @ Hawks || 0–8 || Rea (3–1)  || Norimoto (7–4) || — || PayPay Dome || 9,957 || 39–36–11 || L1
|-align="center" bgcolor="bbffbb"
| 87 || July 13 || @ Hawks || 6–2 || Tanaka (4–5)  || Ishikawa (3–8) || — || PayPay Dome || 9,845 || 40–36–11 || W1
|-align="center" bgcolor="bbffbb"
| 88 || July 14 || @ Hawks || 4–2 || Kishi (4–6)  || Higashihama (2–2) || Matsui (23) || PayPay Dome || 9,930 || 41–36–11 || W2
|- align="center"
|colspan="11" bgcolor="#bbffff"|All-Star Break: CL and PL split series, 1–1
|- align="center"
|colspan="11" bgcolor="#bbffff"|Olympic Break: Japan places first
|-

|- align="center"
|colspan="11" bgcolor="#bbffff"|Olympic Break: Japan places first
|-align="center" bgcolor="bbffbb"
| 89 || August 13 || @ Lions || 5–0 || Kishi (5–6) || Matsumoto (7–5) || — || MetLife Dome || 7,477 || 42–36–11 || W3
|-align="center" bgcolor="bbffbb"
| 90 || August 14 || @ Lions || 7–6 || Sakai (3–1) || Masuda (0–3) || Matsui (24) || MetLife Dome || 7,340 || 43–36–11 || W4
|-align="center" bgcolor="ffbbbb"
| 91 || August 15 || @ Lions || 2–10 || Watanabe (1–2) || Wakui (6–7) || — || MetLife Dome || 7,291 || 43–37–11 || L1
|-align="center" bgcolor="#bbbbbb"
| — || August 17 || Hawks || colspan=4|Postponed (rain) – Makeup date: October 23 || Rakuten Seimei Park || — || — || —
|-align="center" bgcolor="ffbbbb"
| 92 || August 18 || Hawks || 0–3 || Senga (2–1) || Hayakawa (7–4) || Iwasaki (6) || Rakuten Seimei Park || 10,193 || 43–38–11 || L2
|-align="center" bgcolor="ffeeaa"
| 93 || August 20 || @ Fighters || 3–3 || colspan=3|Game tied after 9 innings || Sapporo Dome || 5,566 || 43–38–12 || T1
|-align="center" bgcolor="bbffbb"
| 94 || August 21 || @ Fighters || 8–4 || Kishi (6–6) || Itoh (7–5) || — || Sapporo Dome || 8,413 || 44–38–12 || W1
|-align="center" bgcolor="ffbbbb"
| 95 || August 22 || @ Fighters || 1–2 || Uwasawa (7–5) || Wakui (6–8) || Sugiura (17) || Sapporo Dome || 7,699 || 44–39–12 || L1
|-align="center" bgcolor="#bbbbbb"
| — || August 24 || Buffaloes || colspan=4|Postponed (rain) – Makeup date: October 25 || Rakuten Seimei Park || — || — || —
|-align="center" bgcolor="ffeeaa"
| 96 || August 25 || Buffaloes || 2–2 || colspan=3|Game tied after 9 innings || Rakuten Seimei Park || 4,405 || 44–39–13 || T1
|-align="center" bgcolor="bbffbb"
| 97 || August 26 || Buffaloes  || 7–6 || Norimoto (8–4) || Yamazaki (0–1) || Sung (1) || Rakuten Seimei Park || 4,194 || 45–39–13 || W1
|-align="center" bgcolor="ffbbbb"
| 98 || August 27 || Marines || 1–3 || Kuniyoshi (1–0) || Anraku (3–1) || Masuda (27) || Rakuten Seimei Park || 6,135 || 45–40–13 || L1
|-align="center" bgcolor="ffbbbb"
| 99 || August 28 || Marines || 1–5 || Sasaki (2–2) || Kishi (6–7) || — || Rakuten Seimei Park || 8,111 || 45–41–13 || L2
|-align="center" bgcolor="ffbbbb"
| 100 || August 29 || Marines || 0–1 || Sasaki (7–0) || Sung (1–2) || Masuda (28) || Rakuten Seimei Park || 6,306 || 45–42–13 || L3
|-align="center" bgcolor="bbffbb"
| 101 || August 31 || @ Hawks || 6–3 || Nishiguchi (2–1) || Higashihama (3–3) || Sung (2) || Sun Marine Stadium || 7,484 || 46–42–13 || W1
|-

|-align="center" bgcolor="ffbbbb"
| 102 || September 2 || @ Hawks || 2–5 || Senga (4–1) || Norimoto (8–5) || Kaino (1) || PayPay Dome || 1,630 || 46–43–13 || L1
|-align="center" bgcolor="ffbbbb"
| 103 || September 3 || Lions || 4–8 || Moriwaki (2–0) || Sung (1–3) || — || Rakuten Seimei Park || 4,742 || 46–44–13 || L2
|-align="center" bgcolor="bbffbb"
| 104 || September 4 || Lions || 8–5 || Kishi (7–7) || Imai (6–5) || Sakai (1) || Rakuten Seimei Park || 5,088 || 47–44–13 || W1
|-align="center" bgcolor="bbffbb"
| 105 || September 5 || Lions || 8–2 || Nishiguchi (3–1) || Watanabe (2–3) || — || Rakuten Seimei Park || 6,531 || 48–44–13 || W2
|-align="center" bgcolor="ffbbbb"
| 106 || September 7 || @ Fighters || 2–4 || Itoh (9–5) || Hayakawa (7–5) || Rodriguez (3) || Sapporo Dome || 4,990 || 48–45–13 || L1
|-align="center" bgcolor="bbffbb"
| 107 || September 8 || @ Fighters || 8–0 || Takinaka (6–4) || Uwasawa (8–6) || — || Sapporo Dome || 4,992 || 49–45–13 || W1
|-align="center" bgcolor="bbffbb"
| 108 || September 9 || @ Fighters || 4–0 || Norimoto (9–5) || VerHagen (3–7) || — || Sapporo Dome || 4,989 || 50–45–13 || W2
|-align="center" bgcolor="ffbbbb"
| 109 || September 10 || @ Marines || 2–3 || Masuda (1–4) || Sakai (3–2) || — || Zozo Marine Stadium || 8,387 || 50–46–13 || L1
|-align="center" bgcolor="ffbbbb"
| 110 || September 11 || @ Marines || 1–4 || Ojima (7–3) || Kishi (7–8) || — || Zozo Marine Stadium || 9,924 || 50–47–13 || L2
|-align="center" bgcolor="ffbbbb"
| 111 || September 12 || @ Marines || 2–9 || Kawamura (2–0) || Ishibashi (0–1) || — || Zozo Marine Stadium || 7,794 || 50–48–13 || L3
|-align="center" bgcolor="bbffbb"
| 112 || September 14 || Buffaloes || 4–1 || Hayakawa (8–5) || Miyagi (11–2) || Sakai (2) || Rakuten Seimei Park || 6,034 || 51–48–13 || W1
|-align="center" bgcolor="bbffbb"
| 113 || September 15 || Buffaloes || 7–0 || Takinaka (7–4) || Yamazaki (0–2) || — || Rakuten Seimei Park || 6,739 || 52–48–13 || W2
|-align="center" bgcolor="ffbbbb"
| 114 || September 16 || Buffaloes || 1–3 || Tajima (6–7) || Anraku (3–2) || Hirano (18) || Rakuten Seimei Park || 6,003 || 52–49–13 || L1
|-align="center" bgcolor="#bbbbbb"
| — || September 18 || Hawks || colspan=4|Postponed (rain) – Makeup date: October 24 || Rakuten Seimei Park || — || — || —
|-align="center" bgcolor="bbffbb"
| 115 || September 19 || Hawks || 4–2 || Nishiguchi (4–1) || Iwasaki (2–4) || Sakai (3) || Rakuten Seimei Park || 9,993 || 53–49–13 || W1
|-align="center" bgcolor="ffbbbb"
| 116 || September 20 || Hawks || 4–5 || Matsumoto (2–3) || Tanaka (4–6) || Mori (9) || Rakuten Seimei Park || 9,143 || 53–50–13 || L1
|-align="center" bgcolor="bbffbb"
| 117 || September 22 || @ Lions || 4–2 || Hayakawa (9–5) || Hamaya (1–4) || Sung (3) || MetLife Dome || 8,756 || 54–50–13 || W1
|-align="center" bgcolor="ffbbbb"
| 118 || September 23 || @ Lions || 3–4 || Taira (2–2) || Sakai (3–3) || — || MetLife Dome || 9,396 || 54–51–13 || L1
|-align="center" bgcolor="bbffbb"
| 119 || September 24 || @ Buffaloes || 4–3 || Norimoto (10–5) || Miyagi (11–3) || Sung (4) || Kyocera Dome || 5,275 || 55–51–13 || W1
|-align="center" bgcolor="ffbbbb"
| 120 || September 25 || @ Buffaloes || 2–3 || Yamamoto (15–5) || Kishi (7–9) || Hirano (21) || Kyocera Dome || 9,560 || 55–52–13 || L1
|-align="center" bgcolor="ffeeaa"
| 121 || September 26 || @ Buffaloes || 1–1 || colspan=3|Game tied after 9 innings || Kyocera Dome || 9,589 || 55–52–14 || T1
|-align="center" bgcolor="ffbbbb"
| 122 || September 28 || Fighters || 1–3 || Kawano (3–4) || Hayakawa (9–6) || Sugiura (23) || Rakuten Seimei Park || 4,986 || 55–53–14 || L1
|-align="center" bgcolor="bbffbb"
| 123 || September 29 || Fighters || 5–0 || Takinaka (8–4) || Itoh (9–7) || — || Rakuten Seimei Park || 4,980 || 56–53–14 || W1
|-align="center" bgcolor="bbffbb"
| 124 || September 30 || Fighters || 8–5 || Yuge (1–0) || Kaneko (0–4) || — || Rakuten Seimei Park || 4,991 || 57–53–14 || W2
|-

|-align="center" bgcolor="#bbbbbb"
| — || October 1 || Marines || colspan=4|Postponed (rain) – Makeup date: October 27 || Rakuten Seimei Park || — || — || —
|-align="center" bgcolor="bbffbb"
| 125 || October 2 || Marines || 6–1 || Kishi (8–9) || Futaki (5–6) || — || Rakuten Seimei Park || 9,851 || 58–53–14 || W3
|-align="center" bgcolor="ffbbbb"
| 126 || October 3 || Marines || 0–2 || Ojima (10–3) || Tanaka (4–7) || — || Rakuten Seimei Park || 9,967 || 58–54–14 || L1
|-align="center" bgcolor="ffeeaa"
| 127 || October 5 || @ Hawks || 7–7 || colspan=3|Game tied after 9 innings || PayPay Dome || 8,019 || 58–54–15 || T1
|-align="center" bgcolor="bbffbb"
| 128 || October 6 || @ Hawks || 5–0 || Takinaka (9–4) || Martinez (9–4) || — || PayPay Dome || 8,233 || 59–54–15 || W1
|-align="center" bgcolor="bbffbb"
| 129 || October 7 || @ Marines || 3–2 || Sung (2–3) || Masuda (1–6) || Anraku (1) || Zozo Marine Stadium || 9,933 || 60–54–15 || W2
|-align="center" bgcolor="bbffbb"
| 130 || October 9 || @ Lions || 2–1 || Nishiguchi (5–1) || Taira (2–4) || Anraku (2) || MetLife Dome || 9,301 || 61–54–15 || W3
|-align="center" bgcolor="ffbbbb"
| 131 || October 10 || @ Lions || 2–3 || Taira (3–4) || Nishiguchi (5–2) || — || MetLife Dome || 9,435 || 61–55–15 || L1
|-align="center" bgcolor="bbffbb"
| 132 || October 13 || Hawks || 2–1 || Sung (3–3) || Mori (1–2) || — || Rakuten Seimei Park || 7,334 || 62–55–15 || W1
|-align="center" bgcolor="ffbbbb"
| 133 || October 14 || Hawks || 5–6 || Furuya (1–1) || Anraku (3–3) || Mori (15) || Rakuten Seimei Park || 8,108 || 62–56–15 || L1
|-align="center" bgcolor="ffbbbb"
| 134 || October 15 || Lions || 1–5 || Imai (8–7) || Takinaka (9–5) || — || Rakuten Seimei Park || 9,054 || 62–57–15 || L2
|-align="center" bgcolor="bbffbb"
| 135 || October 16 || Lions || 3–0 || Kishi (9–9) || Hamaya (1–6) || Sung (5) || Rakuten Seimei Park || 8,127 || 63–57–15 || W1
|-align="center" bgcolor="ffbbbb"
| 136 || October 17 || Lions || 5–6 || Watanabe (4–4) || Tanaka (4–8) || Moriwaki (1) || Rakuten Seimei Park || 9,987 || 63–58–15 || L1
|-align="center" bgcolor="ffbbbb"
| 137 || October 18 || Fighters || 0–5 || Kato (5–7) || Yuge (1–1) || — || Rakuten Seimei Park || 8,170 || 63–59–15 || L2
|-align="center" bgcolor="ffbbbb"
| 138 || October 19 || @ Buffaloes || 3–6 || Tajima (8–8) || Hayakawa (9–7) || Hirano (28) || Kyocera Dome || 11,274 || 63–60–15 || L3
|-align="center" bgcolor="bbffbb"
| 139 || October 20 || @ Buffaloes || 5–2 || Norimoto (11–5) || Tomiyama (2–1) || Sung (6) || Kyocera Dome || 11,317 || 64–60–15 || W1
|-align="center" bgcolor="bbffbb"
| 140 || October 23 || Hawks || 8–1 || Takinaka (10–5) || Higashihama (4–4) || — || Rakuten Seimei Park || 10,554 || 65–60–15 || W2
|-align="center" bgcolor="ffbbbb"
| 141 || October 24 || Hawks || 2–6 || Kasaya (3–4) || Kishi (9–10) || — || Rakuten Seimei Park || 11,275 || 65–61–15 || L1
|-align="center" bgcolor="ffbbbb"
| 142 || October 25 || Hawks || 0–4 || Yamamoto (18–5) || Tanaka (4–9) || — || Rakuten Seimei Park || 9,573 || 65–62–15 || L2
|-align="center" bgcolor="bbffbb"
| 143 || October 27 || Marines || 2–1 || Sakai (4–3) || Sasaki (8–1) || Sung (7) || Rakuten Seimei Park || 11,074 || 66–62–15 ||  W1
|-

|-
| Legend:       = Win       = Loss       = Tie       = PostponementBold = Eagles team member

Postseason
Climax Series

Game log

|-align="center" bgcolor="#ffbbbb"
| 1 || November 6 || @ Marines || 4–5 || Masuda (1–0) || Sung (0–1) || — || Zozo Marine Stadium || 14,904 || 0–1–0 || L1
|-align="center" bgcolor="#ffeeaa"
| 2 || November 7 || @ Marines|| 4–4 || colspan=3|Game tied after 9 innings || Zozo Marine Stadium || 14,891 || 0–1–1 || T1
|-

|-
| Legend:       = Win       = Loss       = Tie       = PostponementBold = Lions team member

Roster

 Player statistics 
 Batting 

†Denotes player joined the team mid-season. Stats reflect time with the Eagles only.
‡Denotes player left the team mid-season. Stats reflect time with the Eagles only.
Bold/italics denotes best in the league

 Pitching 

†Denotes player joined the team mid-season. Stats reflect time with the Eagles only.
‡Denotes player left the team mid-season. Stats reflect time with the Eagles only.
Bold/italics denotes best in the league

 Awards and honorsTaiju Life Monthly MVP Award Hideaki Wakui - March/April (pitcher)All-Star Series selections Hideto Asamura - second baseman
 Hiroto Kobukata - infielder
 Yuki Matsui - closing pitcher
 Takahiro Norimoto - pitcher
 Hiroaki Shimauchi - outfielder
 Sung Chia-hao - pitcher
 Masahiro Tanaka - pitcherAll-Star Series MVP'''
 Hiroaki Shimauchi - Game 2

Farm team

Nippon Professional Baseball draft

References

Tohoku Rakuten Golden Eagles
Tohoku Rakuten Golden Eagles seasons